Joseph Christopher Stevenson (born June 15, 1982) is a retired American mixed martial artist fighting out of Hesperia, California. Coached by (UFC Hall of Famer) Matt Hughes, Stevenson rose to prominence by becoming The Ultimate Fighter 2 Welterweight Tournament Winner. Following a drop in weight class and two-year undefeated streak, he was ranked among the top UFC Lightweight competitors, culminating into a title shot for the vacant UFC Lightweight Championship against B.J. Penn at UFC 80: Rapid Fire (after the title was stripped from Sean Sherk). Stevenson fought most of his career as a Lightweight and made his Featherweight debut at UFC Live: Kongo vs. Barry. He is the former King of the Cage Lightweight Champion.

Background
Stevenson began Wrestling at the age of 11. then he started both Judo, and  Jiu-Jitsu, at the age of 13. He moved to Las Vegas in 2004, and began training at Marc Laimon's Cobra Kai in Las Vegas. In March 2008, Stevenson opened his own school in his hometown of Victorville, California. "Joe Stevenson's Cobra Kai" teaches MMA as well as Boxing, Kickboxing, Wrestling, and Jiu-Jitsu. On November 8, 2008, Stevenson earned his Jiu-Jitsu black belt under Robert Drysdale. After his loss to Diego Sanchez, Stevenson got a call from Rashad Evans for an invite to check out his camp at Jackson's Submission Fighting. After being reluctant at first, he finally joined Greg Jackson's camp in April 2009.

Mixed martial arts career

The Ultimate Fighter
Stevenson was one of the more experienced fighters participating in The Ultimate Fighter 2.

On November 5, 2005, Stevenson defeated Luke Cummo by unanimous decision, winning The Ultimate Fighter 2 welterweight tournament and earning a six-figure contract with the UFC, UFC president Dana White said "that was Stephan Bonnar and Forrest Griffin, only on the ground".

UFC start
On April 6, 2006, in his first fight after winning The Ultimate Fighter 2, he was upset by Josh Neer at Ultimate Fight Night 4, losing the fight by unanimous decision. Following the loss, Stevenson announced that he would drop down to the Lightweight division for future bouts.

On July 8, 2006, at UFC 61, Stevenson won his 155-pound debut against Yves Edwards. After opening up a deep cut on Edwards from the top position, the doctors were forced to pull Edwards from the match.

Stevenson returned to the Octagon at UFC 65, defeating Japanese fighter Dokonjonosuke Mishima by guillotine choke in the first round.

Next, Stevenson was booked for the main event at UFC Fight Night 9 against fellow Season 2 contestant Melvin Guillard. Despite a war of words between the two fighters, particularly by Guillard leading up to the bout, Stevenson made quick work of his opponent, knocking down Guillard with a punch before securing a fight-ending guillotine choke.

At UFC 74, Stevenson defeated Kurt Pellegrino by unanimous decision. After the fight doctors determined that during the course of the fight Stevenson's nose had been fractured. With his string of victories at 155, Stevenson established himself as one of the top contenders in the UFC's very competitive Lightweight division.

UFC Lightweight Championship
Stevenson was set to fight BJ Penn for the UFC Interim Lightweight Championship at UFC 80 due to ongoing litigation regarding Sean Sherk's steroid use.  On December 4, 2007, the California State Athletic Commission upheld a reduced suspension for Sherk, prompting the UFC to strip him of the lightweight championship. UFC President Dana White then confirmed that Stevenson and Penn's match would be to fill the vacant lightweight championship, but the winner of that fight would face Sherk at the next opportunity.

Just seconds after the start of the fight, Penn knocked Stevenson down with a right uppercut. From the top position, Penn landed a strong elbow to the head of Stevenson—causing a serious cut on Stevenson's hairline. In the second round, Stevenson fought more aggressively but was still unable to threaten Penn. After taking Stevenson's back, Penn secured a fight-ending rear naked choke at 4:02 of the second round.

UFC after loss to Penn
At UFC 86, Stevenson returned to the Octagon and defeated Gleison Tibau by guillotine choke submission after pulling guard. Tibau tapped quickly at 2:57 in the second round.

At UFC 91 on November 15, 2008, Stevenson was set to face top-contender Kenny Florian in a highly anticipated bout. Despite stating that he was offended to be considered an underdog against Florian, Stevenson was outclassed in the bout. After being taken down three minutes into the fight, Stevenson was mounted and eventually gave up his back to Florian. Florian forced Stevenson, who had just attained his Brazilian Jiu-Jitsu black belt, to submit to a rear naked choke just 4:03 into the first round.

Stevenson returned at UFC 95 in the main event against debuting lightweight Diego Sanchez, and lost via unanimous decision. According to a post-fight statement, he is interested in a rematch.

Stevenson defeated The Ultimate Fighter 5 winner Nate Diaz by unanimous decision at The Ultimate Fighter 9 Finale. Stevenson showed superior wrestling and controlled the majority of the fight.

In his next bout, Stevenson defeated Spencer Fisher by submission due to strikes at UFC 104. Stevenson secured the crucifix position and landed elbows, forcing Fisher to submit.

Stevenson went on to face top 10 contender George Sotiropoulos on February 21, 2010, at UFC 110 in Sydney, Australia.   Stevenson lost a very one sided fight by unanimous decision, but was awarded Fight of the Night honors.

Stevenson was expected to face former Pride Lightweight Champion Takanori Gomi on August 1, 2010 at UFC Live on Versus: 2.  However, Stevenson pulled out of the bout with an injury and was replaced by Tyson Griffin.

Stevenson faced fellow TUF winner Mac Danzig on December 11, 2010 at UFC 124. Stevenson lost via a left hook KO as Danzig was moving back toward the cage. This loss was his first KO loss since 1999.

Stevenson suffered his third consecutive loss after falling short via unanimous decision to Danny Castillo on March 3, 2011 at UFC Live: Sanchez vs. Kampmann.

Stevenson was defeated by Javier Vazquez via unanimous decision in his featherweight debut on June 26, 2011 at UFC on Versus 4. After having four consecutive losses, Stevenson was released from the UFC. He became the fourth The Ultimate Fighter winner to be released from the UFC.

Post-UFC
Stevenson signed a new contract with the Resurrection Fighting Alliance (RFA). He fought Dakota Cochrane at Lightweight in the main event of RFA 3: Stevenson vs. Cochrane on Saturday, June 30, 2012 at the Viaero Event Center in Kearney, Nebraska. Stevenson was rocked early in the first round by a knee from Cochrane, yet Stevenson managed to take Cochrane down to control him throughout the round. At the start of the second round, Cochrane rocked Stevenson again and managed to secure a rear naked choke. Stevenson escaped the attempt, but Cochrane was able to quickly take Stevenson's back a second time and finished via submission due to a rear-naked choke.

Stevenson next fought Dominique Robinson at Sugar Shane Promotions on January 30, 2015. He lost the fight via split decision.

After a year-and-a-half away from the sport, Stevenson returned to the cage July 30, 2016 for the California Fight League. He faced Daniel McWilliams and won the fight via TKO in the first round.

Stevenson made a quick return to the cage, facing Gabriel Miglioli at Tru-Form Entertainment on August 26, 2016.  He won the fight by unanimous decision.

Stevenson is a contestant of The Ultimate Fighter season 25, consisting of fighters that have been competing in previous The Ultimate Fighter seasons.

The Ultimate Fighter: Redemption
In February 2017, it was revealed that Stevenson would compete again on the UFC's reality show in the 25th season on The Ultimate Fighter: Redemption. Stevenson was the fifth pick overall for Team Dillashaw. He was defeated by Justin Edwards in the opening round of fights by unanimous decision. He was defeated by Hayder Hassan by knockout in the first round in the wildcard bout.

Television work
Stevenson signed on to play Fight Coach "Joe Daddy" for 3 episodes in the first season of the DirectTV 2014 series Kingdom. Ultimately he ended being a recurring character, appearing regularly in the episodes.

Personal life
Stevenson is the only son of Carolina Smith of Victorville, California. He has one older sister, Monica; a younger sister, Reye; and a step sister, Jessica.  Stevenson's first wife, Lisa, gave him two sons; Joe Jr. and Tyler. Stevenson and his second wife, Maia, have two sons, Frankie and Maximus. Stevenson's father, Raymond, died from bone marrow cancer when Joe was 17.

He graduated in the class of 2000 from Silverado High School in Victorville, California. As a Hawk Wrestler, he placed in CIF as a sophomore and senior (4th at Masters in March, 2000). Stevenson put his life on hold when his maternal grandfather suddenly became ill in 1999. After finishing high school in June, Joe "Daddy" Stevenson married his first wife; became a father of Joey Jr.; continued to fight professionally for King of the Cage; and wrestled at Victor Valley College to become the 198-lb champion at the 2000 Southern California Community College Regionals (a title previously held by fellow-UFC-star, Tito Ortiz). Stevenson was up a few weight divisions due to his last-minute change of schedule with King of the Cage, and also because of his friend, teammate and two-time Community College All-American at 184, UFC fighter, Phillip Miller.

Stevenson has struggled with alcoholism his whole adulthood, but claims to have been sober since 2014.

Championships and achievements
Ultimate Fighting Championship
The Ultimate Fighter 2 Welterweight Tournament Winner
Fight of the Night (Four times) vs. Yves Edwards, Diego Sanchez, Nate Diaz, George Sotiropoulos
Submission of the Night (Two times) vs. Dokonjonosuke Mishima, Melvin Guillard
First The Ultimate Fighter Tournament Winner in UFC Welterweight History
King of the Cage
KOTC Lightweight Champion (One time; fifth)
KOTC Welterweight Champion (One time; second)
Ring of Fire
Ring of Fire Welterweight Championship
Rage In The Cage
Rage In The Cage Welterweight Championship

Submission grappling
Grapplers Quest
Grapplers Quest Hall of Fame

Mixed martial arts record

|  Win
| align=center| 33–16
| Gabriel Miglioli
| Decision (unanimous)
| TFE Vengeance
| 
| align=center| 3
| align=center| 5:00
| Anaheim, California, United States
|
|-
|  Win
| align=center| 32–16
| Daniel McWilliams
| TKO (punches)
| California Fight League 8: Stevenson vs McWilliams
| 
| align=center| 1
| align=center| 1:21
| San Bernardino, California, United States
|
|-
| Loss
| align=center| 31–16
| Dominique Robinson
| Decision (split)
| Super Brawl Showdown I
| 
| align=center| 5
| align=center| 5:00
| Phoenix, Arizona, United States
| 
|-
| Loss
| align=center| 31–15
| Dakota Cochrane
| Submission (rear-naked choke)
| RFA 3: Stevenson vs. Cochrane
| 
| align=center| 2
| align=center| 1:04
| Kearney, Nebraska, United States
| 
|-
|  Loss
| align=center| 31–14
| Javier Vazquez
| Decision (unanimous)
| UFC Live: Kongo vs. Barry
| 
| align=center| 3
| align=center| 5:00
| Pittsburgh, Pennsylvania, United States
| 
|-
|  Loss
| align=center| 31–13
| Danny Castillo
| Decision (unanimous)
| UFC Live: Sanchez vs. Kampmann
| 
| align=center| 3
| align=center| 5:00
| Louisville, Kentucky, United States
| 
|-
|  Loss
| align=center| 31–12
| Mac Danzig
| KO (punch)
| UFC 124
| 
| align=center| 1
| align=center| 1:54
| Montreal, Quebec, Canada
| 
|-
|  Loss
| align=center| 31–11
| George Sotiropoulos
| Decision (unanimous)
| UFC 110
| 
| align=center| 3
| align=center| 5:00
| Sydney, Australia
| 
|-
|  Win
| align=center| 31–10
| Spencer Fisher
| TKO (submission to elbows)
| UFC 104
| 
| align=center| 2
| align=center| 4:03
| Los Angeles, California, United States
| 
|-
|  Win
| align=center| 30–10
| Nate Diaz
| Decision (unanimous)
| The Ultimate Fighter: United States vs. United Kingdom Finale
| 
| align=center| 3
| align=center| 5:00
| Las Vegas, Nevada, United States
| 
|-
| Loss
| align=center| 29–10
| Diego Sanchez
| Decision (unanimous)
| UFC 95
| 
| align=center| 3
| align=center| 5:00
| London, England
| 
|-
| Loss
| align=center| 29–9
| Kenny Florian
| Submission (rear-naked choke)
| UFC 91
| 
| align=center| 1
| align=center| 4:03
| Las Vegas, Nevada, United States
| 
|-
| Win
| align=center| 29–8
| Gleison Tibau
| Submission (guillotine choke)
| UFC 86
| 
| align=center| 2
| align=center| 2:57
| Las Vegas, Nevada, United States
| 
|-
| Loss
| align=center| 28–8
| B.J. Penn
| Submission (rear-naked choke)
| UFC 80
| 
| align=center| 2
| align=center| 4:02
| Newcastle, England
| 
|-
| Win
| align=center| 28–7
| Kurt Pellegrino
| Decision (unanimous)
| UFC 74
| 
| align=center| 3
| align=center| 5:00
| Las Vegas, Nevada, United States
| 
|-
| Win
| align=center| 27–7
| Melvin Guillard
| Submission (guillotine choke)
| UFC Fight Night: Stevenson vs. Guillard
| 
| align=center| 1
| align=center| 0:27
| Las Vegas, Nevada, United States
| 
|-
| Win
| align=center| 26–7
| Dokonjonosuke Mishima
| Submission (guillotine choke)
| UFC 65: Bad Intentions
| 
| align=center| 1
| align=center| 2:07
| Sacramento, California, United States
| 
|-
| Win
| align=center| 25–7
| Yves Edwards
| TKO (doctor stoppage)
| UFC 61: Bitter Rivals
| 
| align=center| 2
| align=center| 5:00
| Las Vegas, Nevada, United States
| 
|-
| Loss
| align=center| 24–7
| Josh Neer
| Decision (unanimous)
| UFC Fight Night 4
| 
| align=center| 3
| align=center| 5:00
| Las Vegas, Nevada, United States
| 
|-
| Win
| align=center| 24–6
| Luke Cummo
| Decision (unanimous)
| The Ultimate Fighter 2 Finale
| 
| align=center| 3
| align=center| 5:00
| Las Vegas, Nevada, United States
| 
|-
| Win
| align=center| 23–6
| Joe Camacho
| Submission (guillotine choke)
| KOTC 33: After Shock
| 
| align=center| 2
| align=center| 4:36
| San Jacinto, California, United States
| 
|-
| Win
| align=center| 22–6
| Cory Cass
| Submission
| GC 21: Gladiator Challenge 21
| 
| align=center| 1
| align=center| 1:10
| Porterville, California, United States
| 
|-
| Win
| align=center| 21–6
| Thomas Schulte
| KO (knee)
| KOTC 30: The Pinnacle
| 
| align=center| 1
| align=center| 3:29
| Pala, California, United States
| 
|-
| Win
| align=center| 20–6
| Demitrius Jefford
| KO
| GC 19: Gladiator Challenge 19
| 
| align=center| 1
| align=center| 1:09
| Porterville, California, United States
| 
|-
| Win
| align=center| 19–6
| Kiko Cassela
| TKO (corner stoppage)
| KOTC 27: Aftermath
| 
| align=center| 1
| align=center| 4:21
| San Jacinto, California, United States
| 
|-
| Win
| align=center| 18–6
| Thomas Denny
| Submission (guillotine choke)
| KOTC 23: Sin City
| 
| align=center| 1
| align=center| 0:15
| Las Vegas, Nevada, United States
| 
|-
| Win
| align=center| 17–6
| Chuck Kim
| Submission (armbar)
| GC 15: Gladiator Challenge 15
| 
| align=center| 1
| align=center| 1:03
| Porterville, California, United States
| 
|-
| Win
| align=center| 16–6
| Casey Balkenbush
| TKO (elbows)
| GC 14: Gladiator Challenge 14
| 
| align=center| 1
| align=center| 2:27
| Porterville, California, United States
| 
|-
| Loss
| align=center| 15–6
| Romie Aram
| Decision (unanimous)
| KOTC 17: Nuclear Explosion
| 
| align=center| 3
| align=center| 5:00
| San Jacinto, California, United States
| 
|-
| Win
| align=center| 15–5
| Jeremy Jackson
| Submission (punches)
| KOTC 15: Bad Intentions
| 
| align=center| 1
| align=center| 1:27
| San Jacinto, California, United States
| 
|-
| Win
| align=center| 14–5
| Cruz Chacon
| Submission (kneebar)
| Ring Of Fire Warriors 4
| 
| align=center| 1
| align=center| 1:35
| Denver, Colorado, United States
| 
|-
| Win
| align=center| 13–5
| Jerry Gummo
| Submission (rear-naked choke)
| KOTC 12: Cold Blood
| 
| align=center| 1
| align=center| 1:05
| San Jacinto, California, United States
| 
|-
| Win
| align=center| 12–5
| Brad Gumm
| Decision
| UP 1: Ultimate Pankration 1
| 
| align=center| 3
| align=center| 4:00
| Cabazon, California, United States
| 
|-
| Win
| align=center| 11–5
| Gary Aldar
| TKO (punches)
| GC 6: Caged Beasts
| 
| align=center| 1
| align=center| 2:37
| Colusa, California, United States
| 
|-
| Loss
| align=center| 10–5
| Brad Gumm
| Decision
| GC 5: Rumble in the Rockies
| 
| align=center| 3
| align=center| 5:00
| Denver, Colorado, United States
| 
|-
| Win
| align=center| 10–4
| Ryan Painter
| Decision (split)
| KOTC 10: Critical Mass
| 
| align=center| 2
| align=center| 5:00
| San Jacinto, California, United States
| 
|-
| Win
| align=center| 9–4
| Edwin Dewees
| Decision (unanimous)
| GC 4: Collision at Colusa
| 
| align=center| 3
| align=center| 5:00
| Colusa, California, United States
| 
|-
| Loss
| align=center| 8–4
| Ronald Jhun
| Decision (unanimous)
| Warriors Quest 1: The New Beginning
| 
| align=center| 3
| align=center| 5:00
| Honolulu, Hawaii, United States
| 
|-
| Win
| align=center| 8–3
| Maurice Wilson
| Decision (unanimous)
| GC 3: Showdown at Soboba
| 
| align=center| 3
| align=center| 5:00
| Friant, California, United States
| 
|-
| Win
| align=center| 7–3
| Kai Kamaka
| Submission (shoulder lock)
| GC 2: Collision at Colusa
| 
| align=center| 1
| align=center| 2:16
| Colusa, California, United States
| 
|-
| Win
| align=center| 6–3
| Eric Meaders
| Decision (unanimous)
| KOTC 6: Road Warriors
| 
| align=center| 3
| align=center| 5:00
| Mt. Pleasant, Michigan, United States
| 
|-
| Win
| align=center| 5–3
| Mike Berardi
| Decision (unanimous)
| RITC 20: Rage in the Cage 20
| 
| align=center| 3
| align=center| 3:00
| Phoenix, Arizona, United States
| 
|-
| Win
| align=center| 4–3
| David Roberts
| Submission
| HBUP: Huntington Beach Underground Pancrase
| 
| align=center| 1
| align=center| N/A
| Huntington Beach, California, United States
| 
|-
| Win
| align=center| 3–3
| Toby Imada
| Decision
| KOTC 3: Knockout Nightmare
| 
| align=center| 2
| align=center| 5:00
| San Jacinto, California, United States
| 
|-
| Loss
| align=center| 2–3
| Maurice Wilson
| Submission (guillotine choke)
| EFC: Extreme Fighter Challenge
| 
| align=center| 2
| align=center| N/A
| California, United States
| 
|-
| Loss
| align=center| 2–2
| Chris Brennan
| Submission (triangle choke)
| KOTC 1: Bas Rutten's King of the Cage
| 
| align=center| 1
| align=center| 2:04
| San Jacinto, California, United States
| 
|-
| Loss
| align=center| 2–1
| Jens Pulver
| KO (punch)
| rowspan=2|BRI 3: Bas Rutten Invitational 3
| rowspan=2|
| align=center| 1
| align=center| 0:38
| rowspan=2|Colorado, United States
| 
|-
| Win
| align=center| 2–0
| Steve Horton
| Submission (rear-naked choke)
| align=center| 1
| align=center| 2:21
| 
|-
| Win
| align=center| 1–0
| Joe Camacho
| Submission (triangle choke)
| ESF: Empire One
| 
| align=center| 1
| align=center| N/A
|
|

Mixed martial arts exhibition record

|-
|Loss
|align=center|2–2
|Hayder Hassan
|KO (punch)
|The Ultimate Fighter: Redemption
| (airdate)
|align=center|1
|align=center|0:18
|Las Vegas, Nevada, United States
|
|-
|Loss
|align=center|2–1
|Justin Edwards
|Decision (unanimous)
|The Ultimate Fighter: Redemption
| (airdate)
|align=center|2
|align=center|5:00
|Las Vegas, Nevada, United States
|
|-
|win
|align=center|2–0
|Jason Von Flue
|Submission (armbar)
|The Ultimate Fighter 2
| (airdate)
|align=center|1
|align=center|4:46
|Las Vegas, Nevada, United States
|
|-
|Win
|align=center|1–0
|Marcus Davis
|Submission (elbows)
|The Ultimate Fighter 2
| (airdate)
|align=center|1
| align=center|4:10
|Las Vegas, Nevada, United States
|

References

External links
 
 
 Official Website of Joe Stevenson
 Joe Stevenson's Cobra Kai

The Ultimate Fighter winners
1982 births
American male mixed martial artists
Mixed martial artists from California
Lightweight mixed martial artists
Welterweight mixed martial artists
Mixed martial artists utilizing judo
Mixed martial artists utilizing Gaidojutsu
Mixed martial artists utilizing Brazilian jiu-jitsu
American practitioners of Brazilian jiu-jitsu
People awarded a black belt in Brazilian jiu-jitsu
American male judoka
Living people
People from Hesperia, California
People from Torrance, California
Sportspeople from San Bernardino County, California
Ultimate Fighting Championship male fighters
People from Victorville, California